Crane Creek may refer to:

Crane Creek (California), a stream in Sonoma County
Crane Creek, California, a community in Mariposa County
Crane Creek (Melbourne, Florida), a tributary of the Indian River
Crane Creek (Straight River), a stream in Minnesota
Crane Creek (James River), a stream in Missouri
Crane Creek (Pomme de Terre River), a stream in Missouri
Crane Creek (Bluestone River), a stream in West Virginia